Australian rules football in Africa is most organised in South Africa, although there are programs under development in many African nations including Botswana, Egypt, Ghana, Kenya and Zimbabwe and there are plans to introduce the sport into more African countries.

Since the 1980s and increase in immigration from Africa to Australia has seen a rapid rise in the number of Africans playing professionally in the Australian Football League, among the first in the modern era were Stephen Lawrence and Damien Cupido. Prior to that only a handful of South Africans of European heritage had played Australian rules football at the highest level with the earliest known being Aubrey MacKenzie (Melbourne 1914, St Kilda 1922–1924). The success of Majak Daw saw a rise in the popularity of AFL among South Sudanese migrants which have attracted the attention of AFL recruiters in search for the combination of height and athleticism.

Botswana
The government of Botswana approached the AFL in 2009 with a view to extending the FootyWILD program from South Africa across the border into Botswana.  Australian football in South Africa began in the North West Province, an area bordering Botswana and with numerous cultural, linguistic and historical ties to the neighboring country.

Egypt
Australian rules football was played by the ANZACs in Egypt during World War I. The sport has since been revived by Australian expats, with an Auskick program being started in Cairo. The Australian Embassy in Cairo has backed the program.

Ghana
Australian football was played on a non-organised level in Ghana in 2007, where traveling Australians played with children.

In early 2009, AFL club the Western Bulldogs announced that they were in talks with Azumah Nelson regarding the introduction of Australian rules football at the Azumah Nelson Foundation (AZNEF) Sports Academy. Nelson was quoted as saying "Once we become familiar with handling the oval shaped ball, I am sure that Ghana will produce many champions for the AFL Clubs in Australia" The Bulldogs also stated that they may travel to Ghana to visit the AZNEF Sports Academy in future.

Kenya
There have been efforts to start the sport at junior level since 2004. Gus Horsey from the Baltimore Washington Eagles from the United States Australian Football League visited the country in February and September, running several footy clinics and organising a grand final between four local teams in Nairobi. During Horsey's second visit to Kenya to coach Australian rules, he regularly trained over 100 children after school with help from local soccer coaches, although plans through USFooty Kids to continue the clinics in the future did not go ahead.

The AFL reported in 2009 that junior clinics were being conducted in Kenya under the same model as FootyWILD in South Africa.

In 2015, schoolboys international matches were held on the Kenya-Tanzania border.

Senegal
Australian rules football was played sporadically in Senegal during the 1990s, after Darwin-based Mark Moretti visited Dakar for two months in 1991. Moretti had introduced the sport to local children originally as an example of overseas culture, but there was interest from both the children and some local soccer administrators in continuing the sport.  When Moretti returned in 1997 there had not been any progress, so he organised some footballs and other material to be sent to Senegal and the country was represented at the International Australian Football Council AGM in Darwin in 1999. Around this time, two teams were established, named the Crocodiles and the Hares, but the sport has since disappeared in the country.

A team representing Senegal appeared at the "World 9s" in Catalonia in 2008, consisting of Senegalese nationals resident in Spain and competing in the Catalan AFL.

South Africa

The Witwatersrand Gold Rush brought miners from Australia to South Africa and records indicate that it was played from the 1880s to 1909 and was for a time during 1904, the most popular football code in the colony. It was reintroduced by the Australian Defence Force in 1997 and in the 2000s became one of the fastest growing places for the sport outside of Australia, becoming widely played in the North West Province with tens of thousands of players. The governing body is AFL South Africa.

Uganda
Non-organised Australian football at junior level featuring locals has been played in Uganda in 2006.

Western Sahara
Australian football was played on an informal basis in Western Sahara in 2008.

Zimbabwe
The sport of Australian rules football is in its early stages of development in Zimbabwe, with Australian Football Zimbabwe in the planning stage, with its main aims being to combine Aussie rules football as a developing sport, with health clinics and information sessions to be run to assist disadvantaged and sick children.

In 2020, AFL Zimbabwe was formed as the governing body for the sport in Zimbabwe.

Indigenous African Australians
An increasing number of players descended from the Indigenous peoples of Africa have played professionally in the Australian Football League, holding African Australian identity. The successful career of Majak Daw in the AFL is credited as having inspired many children from the South Sudanese migrant community in Australia to take up the sport.

Team Africa at the International Cup
A team known as Team Africa, drawn from various Melbourne African communities, competed in the 2008 Australian Football International Cup's Multicultural Challenge, playing matches against South Africa, Tonga and an Asian community side dubbed Team Asia.

Team Africa's players were from countries including Somalia, Egypt, Ethiopia, Sudan, Nigeria, Kenya, South Africa, Zimbabwe and Djibouti.

References

 
Australian rules football outside Australia